Olga Dmitriyeva (born 10 January 1960) is a Russian diver. She competed in the women's 3 metre springboard event at the 1976 Summer Olympics.

References

External links
 

1960 births
Living people
Russian female divers
Soviet female divers
Olympic divers of the Soviet Union
Divers at the 1976 Summer Olympics
Divers from Moscow
Medalists at the 1973 Summer Universiade